In Ohio, State Route 80 may refer to:
Interstate 80, the only Ohio highway numbered 80 since 1962
Ohio State Route 183, known as SR 80 from 1923 to 1962
Ohio State Route 700, part of SR 80 from 1923 to 1942